Tobias Thomas (born April 30, 1975 in Duisburg) is a German economist and Director General of Statistics Austria. According to the 2019 ranking of economists by Die Presse, F.A.Z., and the Neue Zürcher Zeitung, Thomas is the 5th most influential economist in Austria.

Life 
Thomas studied economics at the Friedrich Wilhelm University of Bonn and Technical University Berlin before earning his doctorate summa cum laude at Helmut-Schmidt-University Hamburg, where he later also gained his habilitation. Thomas was a visiting scholar at, among others, Columbia University and at the Max-Planck Institute for Tax Law and Public Finance in Munich. From 2017 to June 2020, he was director of the economic research institute EcoAustria, based in Vienna. Since June 2020, Thomas is Director General of Statistics Austria.

He is also adjunct professor of economics at the Düsseldorf Institute for Competition Economics (DICE) at Heinrich Heine University Düsseldorf as well as CMDS Fellow at the Central European University (CEU).  He serves as a scientific expert at the Austrian Pension Commission which analyses the financial sustainability of the national pension system.

Scientific work 
In his research at the interface between economics and psychology, Thomas analyses decision processes and behaviour in economic and political contexts. His research interest includes public finance, the economics of political reforms as well as the impact of the media on perception and behaviour. His research results on the impact of media coverage on the population's concerns about migration were published in the Journal of Economic Behavior & Organization (JEBO); the analysis of the impact of media coverage on voting intentions in the European Journal of Political Economy (EJPE); his research on the role of the media in democracies in the Constitutional Political Economy (CPE). In addition, Thomas focusses in his applied research on the sustainability of public finances and social security systems as well as the competitiveness of economies. Thomas is regularly present in national and international media, for example in BusinessDay, Der Standard, Die Presse, Frankfurter Allgemeine Zeitung, Schweizer Monat, Trend and Wirtschaftswoche.

Scientific publications (selection) 

 Dewenter, R., Dulleck, U., & Thomas, T. (2020). Does the 4th estate deliver? The Political Coverage Index and its application to media capture. Constitutional Political Economy, 31, 292-328.
 Frondel, M., & Thomas, T. (2020), Dekarbonisierung bis zum Jahr 2050? Klimapolitische Maßnahmen und Energieprognosen für Deutschland, Österreich und die Schweiz. Zeitschrift für Energiewirtschaft, 44, 195-221.
 Benesch, C., Loretz, S., Stadelmann, D. & T. Thomas (2019), Media Coverage and Immigration Worries: Econometric Evidence. Journal of Economic Behavior & Organization, 160, 52–67.
 Dewenter, R., Linder, M. & T. Thomas (2019), Can media drive the electorate? The impact of media coverage on voting intentions. European Journal of Political Economy, 58, 245–261.
 Berlemann, M. & T. Thomas (2019), The Distance Bias in Natural Disaster Reporting – Empirical Evidence for the United States. Applied Economics Letters, 16, 1026–1032.
 Thomas, T., Heß, M. & G. G. Wagner (2017), Reluctant to Reform? A Note on Risk Loving of Politicians and Bureaucrats. Review of Economics, 68, 167–179.
 Ulbricht, D., Kholodilin, K. & T. Thomas (2017), Do media data help to predict German industrial production? Journal of Forecasting, 36, 483–496.
 Beckmann, K., Dewenter, R. & T. Thomas (2017), Can news draw blood? The impact of media coverage on the number and severity of terror attacks. Peace Economics, Peace Science and Public Policy, 23, 1–16.
 Dewenter, R., Heimeshoff U. & T. Thomas (2016), Media Coverage and Car Manufacturers’ Sales. Economics Bulletin, 36, 976–982.
 Thomas, T. (2013): „What price makes a good a status good? Results from a mating game“, in: European Journal of Law and Economics, 36, 35–55.
 Göbel, M., Schneider, A., & Thomas, T. (2010). Consumption behavior and the aspiration for conformity and consistency. Journal of Neuroscience, Psychology, and Economics, 3(2), 83–94.

Web links 

 Statistik Austria - Prof. Dr. Tobias Thomas
 Heinrich-Heine-Universität Düsseldorf - Prof. Dr. Tobias Thomas
 Central European University (CEU) - Prof. Dr. Tobias Thomas

References 

German economists
Political economists
Public economists
1975 births
University of Bonn alumni
Technical University of Berlin alumni
Helmut Schmidt University alumni
Academic staff of Helmut Schmidt University

Living people